Winestead railway station is a disused railway station on the North Eastern Railway's Hull and Holderness Railway to the south of Winestead, East Riding of Yorkshire, England. It was opened by the Hull and Holderness Railway on 27 June 1854 The station was closed to passengers on 1 July 1904 and freight in 1956.

References

 
 

Disused railway stations in the East Riding of Yorkshire
Railway stations in Great Britain opened in 1854
Railway stations in Great Britain closed in 1904
Former North Eastern Railway (UK) stations
Hull and Holderness Railway